André Luiz Geraissati (7 September 1951) is a Brazilian guitarist. He has played with Grupo D'Alma, Egberto Gismonti, Bobby McFerrin, and Wynton Marsalis.

Grupo D'Alma
From 1979 to 1985 he was a part of Grupo D'Alma, a guitar trio which also included Rui Saleme and Ulisses Rocha.  In 1979 they released A Quem Interessar Possa.  In 1982 they played the International Jazz Festival of São Paulo.

Solo
In 1985 Geraissati began a solo career releasing Insight. In 1987, he signed with Warner Bros. released the double album Solo. In 1988 DADGAD was released, and in 1989, the album 7989.

References

1951 births
Living people
Brazilian jazz musicians